Gare d'Aime-La Plagne is a railway station located in Aime, Savoie, south-eastern France in the European Union. The station is located on the Saint-Pierre-d'Albigny - Bourg-Saint-Maurice railway. The train services are operated by SNCF. It serves the village of Aime and the neighbouring ski resort, La Plagne. The station is served by TGV and Thalys high speed services, as well as local TER Auvergne-Rhône-Alpes services. Eurostar services set down at the station but do not pick up passengers.

Services
High speed services (TGV) Paris - Chambéry - Albertville - Bourg-Saint-Maurice
Local services (TER Auvergne-Rhône-Alpes) (Lyon -) Chambéry - St-Pierre-d'Albigny - Albertville - Bourg-Saint-Maurice

These services operate during the winter ski season:
High speed services (Eurostar) London - Bourg-Saint-Maurice (set down only)
High speed services (Thalys) Amsterdam - Brussels - Chambéry - Bourg-Saint-Maurice

References

External links 
 Timetables, TER Auvergne-Rhône-Alpes

Railway stations in Savoie